Hannes Anier (born 16 January 1993) is an Estonian professional footballer who plays as a forward.

Club career
Anier started his career at Flora. He remained there until 2012, after which he was recruited by Danish Odense Boldklub signing a three-year contract. Anier did not manage to get enough playing time for the first team and the contract was ended in 2013. After leaving Denmark, Anier went on trial with Scottish Premiership side Partick Thistle, Norwegian Tippeligaen side Strømsgodset and HJK before signing with German 2. Bundesliga club Erzgebirge Aue on a three-year deal until 2017. Anier played his first game for Erzgebirge Aue on 24 July 2014 in a friendly match against Bundesliga side VfB Stuttgart coming on as a substitute in the 72nd minute. His contract was terminated prematurely in early February 2015, after Anier had never been played for the club's first team.

International career
Anier made his Estonia debut against Iceland on 4 June 2014. He scored his first goal on his second match against Tajikistan on 7 June 2014.

Personal life
Anier's older brother Henri Anier is also a professional footballer.

Career statistics
Estonia score listed first, score column indicates score after each Anier goal.

Honours
Flora
Meistriliiga: 2011, 2017
Estonian Cup: 2010–11
Estonian Supercup: 2011

References

External links

1993 births
Living people
Footballers from Tallinn
Estonian footballers
Association football forwards
Estonia international footballers
Estonia youth international footballers
Estonia under-21 international footballers
Esiliiga players
Meistriliiga players
Danish Superliga players
FC Flora players
Odense Boldklub players
FC Erzgebirge Aue players
FC Warrior Valga players
FC Elva players
JK Tallinna Kalev players
Estonian expatriate footballers
Estonian expatriate sportspeople in Denmark
Expatriate men's footballers in Denmark
Estonian expatriate sportspeople in Germany
Expatriate footballers in Germany